Kormyansko Saddle (‘Kormyanska sedlovina’ \kor-'myan-ska se-dlo-vi-'na\ is the ice-covered saddle of elevation 992 m in the north foothills of Herbert Plateau on Danco Coast in Graham Land, Antarctica.  It connects Obretenik Bastion to Egerika Range on the north, and is part of the glacial divide between Blériot Glacier to the west and Cayley Glacier to the east.

The saddle is named after the settlement of Kormyansko in Northern Bulgaria.

Location
British mapping in 1978.

Maps
British Antarctic Territory. Scale 1:200000 topographic map. DOS 610 Series, Sheet W 64 60. Directorate of Overseas Surveys, Tolworth, UK, 1978.
 Antarctic Digital Database (ADD). Scale 1:250000 topographic map of Antarctica. Scientific Committee on Antarctic Research (SCAR). Since 1993, regularly upgraded and updated.

Notes

References
 Bulgarian Antarctic Gazetteer. Antarctic Place-names Commission. (details in Bulgarian, basic data in English)
 Kormyansko Saddle. SCAR Composite Gazetteer of Antarctica

External links
 Kormyansko Saddle. Copernix satellite image

Mountain passes of Graham Land
Bulgaria and the Antarctic
Danco Coast